Maharaja Pradyumna Shah or Pradyuman Shah, also known as Pradyumna Chand, was the last and 54th ruler of Garhwal dynasty until the kingdom was independent. He reigned over the state territories from 1785 to 14 May 1804, and later the kingdom was defeated by the Gurkha forces after the Battle of Khurbura occurred near Dehradun.

Background and life
King Pradyuman was possibly placed on the throne from 1785 to 1804. Before ruling the Garhwal, he was crowned as the king of Kumaon from 1779 to 1785 or 1786. During the Coronation ceremony, he was given the name "Pradyman Chand" under which he initially began ruling the territory. Since the king was belonging to reigning dynasty, after Mohan chand defeated and expelled him from kumaon. He was then placed on the throne of Garhwal where he started administering Garhwal.

Death

When Pradyuman's became the king of Garhwal, his kingdom came under the attack of Gurkhas. The king along with his 10,000 soldiers fought the battle when Gorkhas infiltrated through Kotdwara. After 13 days-long battle, the king died on 14 May 1804 while saving his kingdom.

References 

1804 deaths
18th-century Indian monarchs
19th-century Indian monarchs
Year of birth missing